Mary Pat Fisher is an author, her books include the inspirational book Heart of Gold: The Light Within Life and Living religions : an encyclopedia of the world's faiths.

Qualifications
Lives in the Gobind Sadan, an interfaith community in India, founded by Baba Virsa Singh.

Bibliography

References

Year of birth missing (living people)
Living people